The black-billed scythebill (Campylorhamphus falcularius) is a species of bird in the subfamily Dendrocolaptinae. It is found in eastern Brazil, eastern Paraguay and far northeastern Argentina.

Its natural habitats are subtropical or tropical moist lowland forest and subtropical or tropical moist montane forest.

References

black-billed scythebill
Birds of the Atlantic Forest
black-billed scythebill
Taxa named by Louis Jean Pierre Vieillot
Taxonomy articles created by Polbot